Aeroflot Flight 6502 was a Soviet domestic passenger flight operated by a Tupolev Tu-134A from Sverdlovsk (now Yekaterinburg) to Grozny, which crashed on 20 October 1986; 70 of the 94 passengers and crew on board were killed. Investigators determined the cause of the accident was pilot negligence.

Background
The crew of the Tu-134A aircraft, serial number 62327 manufactured on 28 June 1979, consisted of pilot in command Alexander Kliuyev, co-pilot Gennady Zhirnov, navigating officer Ivan Mokhonko, flight engineer Kyuri Khamzatov, and three flight attendants. Having departed from Koltsovo Airport in Yekaterinburg (then Sverdlovsk) and bound for Grozny, Flight 6502 had one stopover at Kurumoch Airport in Samara (then Kuibyshev).

Crash
While approaching Kurumoch Airport, Captain Kliuyev made a bet with First Officer Zhirnov that he, Kliuyev, could make an instrument-only approach with curtained cockpit windows, thus having no visual contact with the ground, instead of an NDB approach, suggested by the air traffic control. Sixty-three people died during the accident and seven more in hospitals later. Among the passengers were 14 children, all of whom survived the accident. The top-secret report of the chairman of Kuibyshev oblispolkom V. A. Pogodin to  Premier Nikolai Ryzhkov gave slightly different figures: Of 85 passengers and eight crew members aboard, 53 passengers and five crew members died in the crash and 11 more in hospitals later.

Though Zhirnov made no attempt to avert the crash, he subsequently tried to save the passengers and died of cardiac arrest en route to hospital. Kliuyev was prosecuted and sentenced to 15 years in prison, later reduced to six years served.

See also 
 Northwest Airlines Flight 188, where the pilots stopped monitoring the flight
 Pinnacle Airlines Flight 3701, a crash where the pilots chose, for fun, to exceed aircraft limits
 Aeroflot Flight 593, a crash where the pilots let minors fly the aircraft
 United Airlines Flight 2885, a crash where the pilots let the flight engineer fly the plane

References

Aviation accidents and incidents in 1986
Aviation accidents and incidents in Russia
Aviation accidents and incidents in the Soviet Union
Accidents and incidents involving the Tupolev Tu-134
6502
Airliner accidents and incidents caused by pilot error
1986 in the Soviet Union
Samara, Russia
October 1986 events in Europe